San Carlos is a census-designated place (CDP) in Gila County, Arizona, United States. The population was 4,038 at the 2010 census, up from 3,716 in 2000.

San Carlos is the largest community in and the seat of government for the San Carlos Apache Indian Reservation.

San Carlos' economy is underdeveloped and is based mainly on retail service industries, construction trades, and public administration.

Geography
San Carlos is located in southeastern Gila County at  (33.351069, -110.459862). Its eastern border is the San Carlos River, which is also the Graham County line. The San Carlos River flows south  to San Carlos Lake, an impoundment on the Gila River.

San Carlos is located within the San Carlos Apache Indian Reservation.

Demographics

As of the census of 2000, there were 3,716 people, 921 households, and 754 families living in the CDP. The racial makeup of the CDP was 92.6% Native American, 4.6% White, 0.2% Black or African American, 0.3% Asian, 0.2% from other races, and 2.0% from two or more races.  2.6% of the population were Hispanic or Latino of any race.

There were 921 households, out of which 49.1% had children under the age of 18 living with them, 46.1% were married couples living together, 29.4% had a female householder with no husband present, and 18.1% were non-families. 14.4% of all households were made up of individuals, and 2.7% had someone living alone who was 65 years of age or older.  The average household size was 4.0 and the average family size was 4.4.

In the CDP, the population was spread out, with 42.1% under the age of 18, 8.7% from 18 to 24, 28.0% from 25 to 44, 15.8% from 45 to 64, and 5.4% who were 65 years of age or older.  The median age was 24 years. For every 100 females, there were 96.4 males.  For every 100 females age 18 and over, there were 96.2 males.

The median income for a household in the CDP was $13,412, and the median income for a family was $14,219. Males had a median income of $16,216 versus $22,563 for females. The per capita income for the CDP was $4,615.  About 57.5% of families and 58.8% of the population were below the poverty line, including 62.4% of those under age 18 and 56.5% of those age 65 or over.

Transportation
San Carlos Apache Nnee Bich'o Nii Transit provides transportation on the reservation and to Safford and Globe.

References

External links
 KRDE 94.1 FM

Census-designated places in Gila County, Arizona